Consolidated Safety-Valve Co. v. Crosby Steam Gauge & Valve Co., 113 U.S. 157 (1885), was a patent case to determine validity of patent No. 58,294, granted to George W. Richardson September 25, 1866, for an improvement in steam safety valves.

Technical background
Richardson was the first person who made a safety valve which, while it automatically relieved the pressure of steam in the boiler, did not, in effecting that result, reduce the pressure to such an extent as to make the use of the relieving apparatus practically impossible because of the expenditure of time and fuel necessary to bring up the steam again to the proper working standard.

His valve was the first which had the strictured orifice to retard the escape of the steam and enable the valve to open with increasing power against the spring and close suddenly, with small loss of pressure in the boiler.

Ruling
The direction given in the patent that the flange or lip is to be separated from the valve seat by about one sixty-fourth of an inch for an ordinary spring, with less space for a strong spring and more space for a weak spring, to regulate the escape of steam as required, is a sufficient description as matter of law, and it is not shown to be insufficient as a matter of fact.

Letters patent No. 85,963, granted to said Richardson January 19, 1869, for an improvement in safety valves for steam boilers or generators, are valid.

The patents of Richardson were infringed by a valve which produces the same effects in operation by the means described in Richardson's claims, although the valve proper is an annulus and the extended surface is a disc inside of the annulus, the Richardson valve proper being a disc and the extended surface an annulus surrounding the disc, and although the valve proper has two ground joints, and only the steam which passes through one of them goes through the stricture, while, in the Richardson valve, all the steam which passes into the air goes through the stricture, and although the huddling chamber is at the center instead of the circumference, and is in the seat of the valve, under the head, instead of in the head, and the stricture is at the circumference of the seat of the valve instead of being at the circumference of the head.

The fact that the prior patented valves were not used and the speedy and extensive adoption of Richardson's valve support the conclusion as to the novelty of the latter.

Suits in equity having been begun in 1879 for the infringement of the two patents, and the circuit court having dismissed the bills, this Court in reversing the decrees after the first patent had expired but not the second, awarded accounts of profits and damages as to both patents, and a perpetual injunction as to the second patent.

See also
List of United States Supreme Court cases, volume 113

References

External links
 

United States Supreme Court cases
United States Supreme Court cases of the Waite Court
Steam power
1885 in United States case law
United States patent case law
Safety valves